The FIBA Asia Champions Cup 2011 was the 22nd staging of the FIBA Asia Champions Cup, the basketball club tournament of FIBA Asia. The tournament was held in Pasig, Philippines from May 28 to June 5, 2011. The event is co-organized by the Samahang Basketbol ng Pilipinas and FIBA Asia.

Al Riyadi from Lebanon, after going undefeated in the entire tournament, won its first ever Fiba Asia Champions Cup title after defeating Mahram Tehran from Iran in the final game. It was the fourth time a club from Lebanon has won the championship.

Al-Rayyan from Qatar, on the other hand, finished third in the tournament after defeating Smart Gilas from the Philippines in the third-place game.

Bid
The Samahang Basketbol ng Pilipinas (SBP) originally wanted to host the 2011 FIBA Asia Championship, which was the qualifying tournament in Asia for the men's basketball event of the 2012 Summer Olympics, after reports circulated that FIBA was planning to remove the hosting rights of the tournament from Beirut, Lebanon.

SBP, the national sport association for basketball in the Philippines, lost its bid to host the Asian Championships, and the hosting rights was awarded to Wuhan, China. Nevertheless, FIBA Asia offered the FIBA Asia Champions Cup, the Asian club championship, of the same year to the country. Newly appointed SBP executive director Sonny Barrios, who replaced Noli Eala, said that he considers the hosting of the 22nd FIBA Asia Champions Cup as one of his priorities as SBP's top executive. Barrios, a former commissioner of the Philippine Basketball Association, said that, “The name of the country is at stake here so we have to make sure that everything runs smoothly.”

It was the third time that the Philippines hosted the event. The last FIBA Asia event that the country hosted was the 2005 FIBA Asia Champions Cup. In welcoming the country as the host of the tournament, FIBA Asia president Sheikh Saud bin Ali Al-Thani of Qatar said that, "The 2011 calendar could not have gotten to a better start than with an event in the Philippines, where basketball is almost a religion." The country last won the club championship in 1996 when Hapee Toothpaste defeated Japanese basketball club Isuzu Lynx.

Venue

Former SBP executive director Noli Eala announced that the venue for the FIBA Asia Champions Cup  in 2011 would be the Philsports Arena in Pasig, Manila, Philippines. The arena, which is located inside the PhilSports Complex, is maintained by the Philippine Sports Commission, a government-run organization aimed at developing sports in the country.

The arena enjoys a rich basketball tradition having been the venue of most of the games of the Philippine Basketball Association, the first and oldest professional basketball league in Asia and the oldest in the world outside the U.S., from 1985 to 1992 and from 1999 to 2002. Further, it also hosted the majority of the games in the elimination round of the basketball tournaments of the 2010–11 season of the University Athletic Association of the Philippines.

In January 2011, FIBA Asia deputy secretary general Hagop Khajirian along with SBP president Manuel V. Pangilinan inspected the venue.

Qualification
Ten professional basketball clubs from the Asian region competed in the annual tournament. All of the five FIBA Asia sub-zones had one automatic berth each. The Philippines were represented by Smart Gilas, the country's Philippine national team, as part of the club's preparations for the FIBA Asia Championship of the same year. Smart Gilas was joined by nine other teams from West Asia, Middle Asia, East Asia, Southeast Asia, and the Gulf.

For the participating clubs teams from the Gulf sub-zone, Al Shabab and Al-Rayyan were representing United Arab Emirates and Qatar, respectively. A club from the Middle Asia sub-zone was also invited to participate in the tournament. But due to financial reasons, the invited teams from Kazakhstan and Afghanistan begged off from the tournament. FIBA Asia Champions Cup 2011 organizing committee chairman Aboy Castro said that a replacement club from India, which is also bracketed under the Middle Asia sub-zone  by FIBA Asia, has already been contacted. However, India withdrew from participating in the tournament.

Initially, the East Asia sub-zone was supposed to be represented by a club from Japan. FIBA Asia deputy secretary general Hagop Khajirian, at the tournament's group draw, reported that a top Japanese club from the BJ League would participate in the Asia Champions Cup this year. Khajirian said that they were waiting for either the Ryukyu Golden Kings or Rizing Fukuoka to confirm their participation. However, the Japan Basketball Association withdrew from the tournament, prompting the organizers to invite a replacement from the Korean Basketball League. Afterwards, South Korea declined the invitation to participate in the event.

Wild cards
Two wild cards were determined by FIBA Asia as Korea and India failed to confirm their participation in the tournament. The spots for the two countries were filled in by Duhok of Iraq and Al-Ittihad of Saudi Arabia. FIBA Asia secretary general Dato Yeoh Choo Hock, explaining the wild cards, said that, "Our aim is to have a fairly balanced and completely competitive event. In the past too, we have given similar wild cards keeping mind the need for a competitive event."

WABA Super League
Four teams were eligible to qualify from the West Asia Basketball Association Champions Cup, which is the West Asian basketball club championship. Lebanese basketball team Al-Riyadi, who placed third in both 2008 and 2009 editions of the FIBA Asia Champions Cup, and Syrian club Al Jalaa have qualified by just entering the semifinals of the 2011 WABA Super League. Even though Al-Jalaa did not show up to play the fifth game of the WABA finals in 2011, the club was still allowed to participate in the year's Champions Cup. However, the team was penalized with a two-year ban from playing in the WABA Champions Cup and was also fined US$30,000.

Two-time defending FIBA Asia Champions Cup winner Mahram Tehran defeated Zob Ahan in their battle for third place to qualify as the team from Iran. ASU, on the other hand, beat Al Riyadi Aramex in the qualifying game to identify the Jordanian representative to the tournament.

ASEAN Basketball League
In March 2011, FIBA Asia secretary general Dato Yeoh Choo Hock announced that the Chang Thailand Slammers, the 2010–11 ASEAN Basketball League champions, would represent the South East Asia sub-zone in the event. However, the Basketball Association of Thailand got suspended, prohibiting the team from participating in any FIBA-sanctioned event. This led ABL CEO Kuhan Foo and FIBA Asia to replace the Slammers with the Westports KL Dragons, ranked third in the ABL, for the year's Champions Cup.

To prepare for the tournament, the Malaysian players of the KL Dragons competed as a team in the 17th Father Martin Cup, a pre-season collegiate basketball tournament in the Philippines. KL Dragons assistant coach Ariel Vanguardia was also named head coach of the team for the Champions Cup as Goh Heng Chuat, who coaches the team in the ABL, is busy preparing the Malaysia national basketball team for the 2011 Southeast Asia Basketball Association tournament and the 2011 Southeast Asian Games.

Qualified teams

* Note: For the East Asia sub-zone, Japan withdrew from the event as they were still recovering from the Tōhoku earthquake and tsunami. Korea also turned down the invitation to participate in the event. Japan's original slot was later awarded to Al-Ittihad of Saudi Arabia. For the middle Asia sub-zone, its slot was awarded to Duhok of Iraq after Kazakhstan, Afghanistan, and India all begged off from the tournament.

Group draw
The draw was held on April 15, 2011 at the Discovery Suites Hotel, Pasig. FIBA Asia deputy secretary general Hagop Khajirian conducted the draw along with SBP president Manny Pangilinan, SBP executive director Sonny Barrios, and former FIBA Asia secretary general Mauricio C. Martelino. The qualified basketball clubs were divided into two groups of five.

Squads

All 10 participating clubs for the 2011 Fiba Asia Champions Cup had 15 players on their rosters. Each team was allowed to tap two imports to reinforce their squads.

Opening ceremony
The opening ceremony of the tournament was held on May 27, 2011 at the Meralco multi-purpose hall in Pasig. The participating teams from West Asia, Southeast Asia, and the Gulf regions attended the welcome dinner where the Filipino culture dominated the theme of the ceremony. The guests were entertained by Filipino folk dances during the event, and were served Filipino dishes.

Preliminary round
For the preliminary round, 10 teams were drawn into two groups composing of five teams each. The clubs played against all the other teams in their respective groups. The top four teams from each group advanced to the knockout stage. The two teams that finished last in their groups played against each other for the ninth place.

Group A

All times are local (UTC+08).

Group B

All times are local (UTC+08).

Knockout round

Championship bracket

Consolation bracket

Quarterfinals
All times are local (UTC+08).

Semifinals 5th–8th

Semifinals

7th place
All times are local (UTC+08).

5th place

3rd place

Finals

Final standings

Awards

Statistical leaders
The top ten of the five statistics are shown below.

Points

Rebounds

Assists

Blocks

Steals

Tournament officials
Through the tournament's official website, FIBA Asia named the referees and commissioners that will officiate the FIBA Asia Champions Cup 2011. Below are the technical officials for the entire tournament:

Media

Broadcasting rights
The FIBA Asia Champions Cup was aired on Philippine VHF television network Intercontinental Broadcasting Corporation via Sports5. In April 2011, Sports5, the sports division of TV5, signed a blocktime agreement with IBC-13 to air live sports coverage via AKTV, a primetime block that airs local and international sports events.

Event website
In May 2011, FIBA Asia announced that the official site of the tournament has gone live online. The website has all the information about the event such as its overview, rosters, and system of competition. In addition, the website also features real-time updates as well as news, live game results, and interviews.

Live streaming
The organizers announced in June 2011 that all of the final round games of the FIBA Asia Champions Cup 2011 will be streamed live on FIBAtv.com and FIBAAsiaTV.com. The highlights of all these games will also be available in the tournament's official website.

References

External links 
 
 
 

2011
Champions Cup
Champions Cup
International basketball competitions hosted by the Philippines